The Lord Lieutenant of Greater Manchester is the representative of the monarch, King Charles III in the metropolitan county of Greater Manchester in North West England. As Greater Manchester remains part of the Lancashire County Palatine, the Lord Lieutenant is appointed by the monarch in their capacity as Duke of Lancaster.

The office was created on 1 April 1974. Before 1974 the area had been covered by the Lord Lieutenant of Lancashire, the Lord Lieutenant of Cheshire, and a small part by the Lord Lieutenant of the West Riding of Yorkshire. The role of the Lord Lieutenant is to "first and foremost ... to uphold the dignity of the Crown". The Lord Lieutenant also acts as Keeper of the Rolls. It also promoted the work of voluntary service and benevolent organisations.

The Lord Lieutenant is aided in his office by over seventy deputy lieutenants.

List of lords-lieutenant of Greater Manchester

See also
High Sheriff of Greater Manchester

References

External links
Lord Lieutenant of Greater Manchester

Local government in Greater Manchester
Manchester, Greater

1974 establishments in England
Lord-Lieutenants